"Ramblin Man" is a song by American rock band The Allman Brothers Band, released in August 1973 as the lead single from the group's fourth studio album, Brothers and Sisters (1973). Written and sung by guitarist Dickey Betts, the song was inspired by a 1951 song of the same name by Hank Williams. It is considerably more inspired by country music than other Allman Brothers Band compositions, which made the group reluctant to record it. Guitarist Les Dudek provides guitar harmonies, and it was one of bassist Berry Oakley's last contributions to the band.

The song became the Allman Brothers Band's first and only top 10 single, peaking at number two on the Billboard Hot 100 chart and number 12 on the Easy Listening chart.

Background
"Ramblin Man" was first created during songwriting sessions for Eat a Peach. An embryonic version, referring to a "ramblin' country man," can be heard on the bootleg The Gatlinburg Tapes, featuring the band jamming on an off-day in April 1971 in Gatlinburg, Tennessee. Betts continued to work on the song for a year, but the lyrics came together in as little as twenty minutes. "I wrote "Ramblin' Man" in Berry Oakley's kitchen [at the Big House] at about four in the morning. Everyone had gone to bed but I was sitting up," said Betts in 2014. Trucks noted that the band acknowledged it was a good song but were reluctant to record it, as it sounded too country for them. New member and keyboardist Chuck Leavell enjoyed the song, noting, "It's definitely in the direction of country but that didn't bother me in the least […] I think our attitude was, 'Let's take this thing and make it as great as we can.'" The song was inspired by a 1951 song of the same name by Hank Williams.

It was one of the first songs, alongside "Wasted Words", recorded for Brothers and Sisters (1973). They went to the studio to record a demo of the song to send to a friend, which is where the long guitar jam near the finale of the song was created. Having not considered it an Allman Brothers song before, they felt the solos fit the band well and decided to put it on the album. Guitarist Les Dudek, who was contributing to Brothers and Sisters, was sitting in the control room when the song was being recorded. He and Betts had worked out the harmony parts together. Betts continued to approach him for his thoughts on the recordings; eventually, he asked him to come record the song with him. "We played it all live. I was standing where Duane would have stood with Berry just staring a hole through me and that was very intense and very heavy," said Dudek. When the song was completed, the management team and road crew gathered to listen to the song. According to Dudek, the room was silent upon its ending and roadie Red Dog remarked, "That's the best I heard since Duane."

Johnny Sandlin, producer of Brothers and Sisters, remarked that he thought it was "crazy" to be released as a single, because "nothing else sounds remotely similar, with the possible exception of 'Blue Sky,' which had a similar, upbeat major-key bounce."

Composition
The song is set in the time signature of common time, with a tempo of 182 beats per minute. It is set in the key of A-flat major. Betts's vocals range from the low-note of Ab3 to the high-note of Gb4.

Reception
Capricorn executives were split between issuing "Wasted Words" or "Ramblin Man" as the lead single. National promotion director Dick Wooley sent advance tapes of "Ramblin Man" to WQXI-AM in Atlanta and WRKO-AM in Boston radio stations and "listener phone-in reaction was near-phenomenal." "Ramblin Man" broke hard rock barriers and became a hit on AM stations nationwide, and it rose to number two on the Billboard Hot 100. It was prevented from topping the chart due to the success of Cher's "Half-Breed."

AllMusic writes that "the chorus is perhaps the catchiest and prettiest hook in all of Southern rock". Robert Christgau called the tune "miraculous".

Chart performance

Notes

References

Sources

External links

 Official website
 

1972 songs
1973 singles
Songs written by Dickey Betts
The Allman Brothers Band songs
Gary Stewart (singer) songs
Capricorn Records singles
Songs about the American South
Cashbox number-one singles